Roy Alexander Barry (born 19 September 1942) is a Scottish former professional footballer.

Barry played for Musselburgh Athletic's junior side before being signed by Hearts. He then moved to Dunfermline for £13,000, where he helped the club defeat Hearts in the 1968 Scottish Cup Final. Dunfermline sold him to Coventry City for £40,000, who then sold him to Crystal Palace for £45,000. He later signed for Hibernian and ended his senior playing career at East Fife, who he also managed. Barry later became caretaker manager of Oxford United.

References

External links

London Hearts

1942 births
Coventry City F.C. players
Crystal Palace F.C. players
Dunfermline Athletic F.C. players
East Fife F.C. managers
East Fife F.C. players
Heart of Midlothian F.C. players
Hibernian F.C. players
Nuneaton Borough F.C. players
Living people
Oxford United F.C. managers
Footballers from Edinburgh
Scottish Football League players
Scottish football managers
Scottish footballers
English Football League players
Scottish Football League managers
Association football defenders